The Immigration Polytechnic (Indonesian: Politeknik Imigrasi, colloquially Poltekim) is an Indonesian government service academy under the aegis of the Ministry of Law and Human Rights. The Indonesian Polytechnic was founded in 1962, and it was re-established in 2000. Its mission is to train individuals who would like to be employed as government employees in the field of immigration, whether they would like to be posted at immigration offices Indonesia-wide or at immigration units in Indonesian overseas missions.

Programmes of study 
The Polytechnic offers the following programmes of study:

 Diploma III Keimigrasian (Associate's Degree in Immigration)
 Diploma IV Hukum Keimigrasian (Bachelor's Degree in Immigration Law)
 Diploma IV Administrasi Keimigrasian (Bachelor's Degree in Immigration Administration)
 Diploma IV Manajemen Teknologi Keimigrasian (Bachelor's Degree in Immigration Technology Management)

See also 

 Directorate General of Immigration (Indonesia)

Reference list 

Universities in Indonesia
Universities in West Java
Government of Indonesia
Higher education in Indonesia